Ramallah is a Palestinian city in the central West Bank that serves as the de facto administrative capital of the State of Palestine.

Ramallah has buildings containing masonry from the period of Herod the Great, but no complete building predates the Crusades of the 11th century. The modern city was founded during the 16th century by the Hadadeens, an Arab Christian clan descended from Ghassanids. In 1517, the city was incorporated into the Ottoman Empire, and in 1920, it became part of British Mandatory Palestine after it was captured by the United Kingdom during World War I. The 1948 Arab–Israeli War saw the entire West Bank, including Ramallah, occupied and annexed by Transjordan. Ramallah was later captured by Israel in the 1967 Six-Day War. Since the 1995 Oslo Accords, Ramallah has been governed by the PNA as part of Area A of the West Bank. 

In recent years, Ramallah has emerged as a key political, cultural, and economic center. It houses various Palestinian governmental bodies, including the Mukataa, the official residence of the President of the Palestinian National Authority, the Palestinian Legislative Council, and the headquarters of the Palestinian Security Services. It is also home to several museums and cultural centers, and has a notable nightlife scene. While historically a predominantly Christian town, Muslims constituted a majority of Ramallah's 38,998 residents by 2017, with Christians making up a significant minority.

History

Ancient times
Ancient rock-cut tombs have been found near Ramallah. Located just south of the built-up area is Tell en-Nasbeh, an archeological site where biblical Mizpah in Benjamin is likely to have been located.

Several Ramallah buildings incorporate masonry dating back to the reign of Herod the Great (37-4 BCE).

Crusader period
Potsherds from the Crusader/Ayyubid and early Ottoman period have also been found there.

Ramallah has been identified with the Crusader place called Ramalie. Remains of a building with an arched doorway from the Crusader era, called al-Burj, have been identified, but the original use of the building is undetermined.

Ottoman era
Ramallah was incorporated into the Ottoman Empire in 1517 with all of Palestine. In 1596 it was listed in the tax registers as being in the nahiya of Quds, part of the Liwa of Quds. It had a population of 71 Christian households and 9 Muslim households. It paid a fixed tax rate of 25% on wheat, barley, olives, vines or fruit trees, and goats or beehives; a total of 9,400 akçe. All of the revenue went to a waqf.

Modern Ramallah was founded in the mid-1500s by the Haddadins (also: Haddadeen), a clan of brothers descended from Ghassanid Christians. The Haddadins (ancestors of the present-day Jadallah family, among others), and their leader Rashid El-Haddadin, arrived from east of the Jordan River from the areas of Karak and Shoubak. The Haddadin migration is attributed to fighting and unrest among clans in that area.

Haddadin was attracted to the mountainous site of Ramallah because it was similar to the other mountainous areas he came from. In addition, the heavily forested area could supply him with plenty of fuel for his forges.

In 1838 American biblical scholar Edward Robinson visited the area, noting that the inhabitants were Christian "of the Greek rite". There were 200 taxable men, which gives an estimated total population of 800–900 people. The village "belonged" to the Haram al-Sharif, Jerusalem, to which it paid an annual tax of 350 Mids of grain.

In 1883, the PEF's Survey of Western Palestine described Ramallah as

A large Christian village, of well-built stone houses, standing on a high ridge, with a view on the west extending to the sea. It stands amongst gardens and olive-yards, and has three springs to the south and one on the west; on the north there are three more, within a mile from the village. On the east there is a well. There are rock-cut tombs to the north-east with well-cut entrances, but completely blocked with rubbish. In the village is a Greek church, and on the east a Latin convent and a Protestant schoolhouse, all modern buildings. The village lands are Wakuf, or ecclesiastical property, belonging to the Haram of Jerusalem. About a quarter of the inhabitants are Roman Catholics, the rest Orthodox Greeks.

In the 21st century, a large community of people with direct descent from the Haddadins who founded Ramallah live in the United States. The town is now predominately Muslim, but still contains a Christian minority. The change in demographics is due mostly to new migration of Muslims to the area, and emigration of Christians from the area.

Christian presence

Ramallah grew dramatically throughout the 17th and 18th centuries as an agricultural village, attracting more (predominantly Christian) inhabitants from all around the region. In 1700, Yacoub Elias was the first Ramallah native to be ordained by the Eastern Greek Melkite Orthodox Church of Jerusalem, the Christian denomination that prevailed in the Holy Land at the time. In the early 19th century, the first Greek Melkite Jerusalemite Orthodox Christian church was built. Later, in 1852, the Greek Orthodox Church of Transfiguration, was built to replace it; it is the sole Orthodox Church in Ramallah today. There is also a Greek Catholic (Melkite) Church in Ramallah, built in 1895.

The Roman Catholic Church also established its presence in Ramallah the 19th century and constitutes today the second largest Christian denomination in the city. The Roman Catholic Church established the St. Joseph's Girls' School run by St. Joseph sisters, as well as the co-educational Al-Ahliyyah College high school runs by Rosary sisters. In 1913, construction of the Catholic Holy Family Church was started.

Currently, Ramallah also has a Coptic Church, an Evangelical Lutheran Church and an Episcopalian (Anglican) Church.

In the 19th century, the Religious Society of Friends (Quakers) established a presence in Ramallah and built the Ramallah Friends Schools, one for girls and later a boys' school, to alleviate the dearth of education for women and girls. Eli and Sybil Jones opened "The Girls Training Home of Ramallah" in 1869. A medical clinic was established in 1883, with Dr. George Hassenauer serving as the first doctor in Ramallah. In 1889, the girls academy became the Friends Girls School (FGS). As the FGS was also a boarding school, it attracted a number of girls from surrounding communities, including Jerusalem, Lydda, Jaffa, and Beirut. The Friends Boys School (FBS) was founded in 1901 and opened in 1918. The Quakers opened a Friends Meeting House for worship in the city center in 1910. According to the school's official website, most high school students choose to take the International Baccalaureate exams (IBE) instead of the traditional "Tawjihi" university exams.

The activity of foreign churches in Palestine in the late 19th century increased awareness of prosperity in the West. In Ramallah and Bethlehem, a few miles south, local residents began to seek economic opportunity overseas. In 1901, merchants from Ramallah emigrated to the United States and established import-export businesses, selling handmade rugs and other exotic wares across the Atlantic. Increased trade dramatically improved living standards for Ramallah's inhabitants. American cars, mechanized farming equipment, radios, and later televisions became attainable luxuries for upper-class families. As residents of Jaffa and Lod moved to Ramallah, the balance of Muslims and Christians began to change.

Ramallah was declared a modern city in 1908. It had an elected municipality as well as partnership projects with the adjacent town of al-Bireh. The Friends Boys School became a temporary hospital during World War I.

British Mandate
During World War I, the British Army captured and occupied Ramallah in December 1917. The city remained occupied until the designation of the Palestine Mandate in 1920, resulting in Ramallah falling under British Mandatory control until 1948. In the 1920s, the economy of Ramallah started to improve, resulting in the local Arab upper class (consisting primarily of landowners and merchants) ordering the construction of several multi-storied villas, many of which still stand today. In 1939, the Jerusalem Electric Company introduced electricity to Ramallah, and a majority of the city's homes became wired shortly thereafter. On the same year, the British Mandatory authorities inaugurated the state-owned Palestine Broadcasting Service in Ramallah, with BBC members training local radio staff to deliver daily broadcasts in Arabic, Hebrew, and English. The station was later renamed Jerusalem Calling.

In 1936, an Arab revolt against the British Mandate broke out in Palestine, and Ramallah soon became a center of insurgent activity. The rebels subsequently established a court near Ramallah, in order to provide legal alternatives to the courts of the British Mandate. One British schoolteacher noted that the Ramallah court judge began to produce "news sheets on typewriters and duplicators, aimed at publicizing the alternative rebel regime."

Jordanian era

Following the creation of the State of Israel and the ensuing conflict, Jordan seized the part of Palestine they named the West Bank. This included Ramallah. The West Bank was relatively peaceful during the years of Jordanian rule between 1948 and 1967, with its residents enjoying freedom of movement between the West Bank, Jordan, Lebanon, and Syria. Jordan annexed the West Bank, applying its national law to the conquered territory. However, many Palestinians were jailed for being members of "illegal political parties", which included the Palestine Communist Party and other socialist and pro-independence groups. By 1953, Ramallah's population had doubled, but the economy and infrastructure could not accommodate the influx of poor villagers. Natives of Ramallah began to emigrate, primarily to the United States. By 1956, about one fourth of Ramallah's 6,000 natives had left, with Arabs from the surrounding towns and villages (particularly Hebron) buying the homes and land the émigrés left behind.

Israeli era

During the Six-Day War in 1967, Israel captured Ramallah from Jordan, imposing a military closure and conducting a census a few weeks later. Every person registered in the census was given an Israeli identity card which allowed the bearer to continue to reside there. Those who were abroad during the census lost their residency rights. For residents of Ramallah, the situation had now been reversed. For the first time in 19 years, residents could freely visit Israel and the Gaza Strip and engage in commerce there.

Unlike the Jordanians, Israel did not offer citizenship to the residents. Ramallah residents were issued permits to work in Israel, but did not gain the rights associated with Israeli citizenship. The city remained under Israeli military rule for more than four decades.

The Israeli Civil Administration (CA), established in 1981, was in charge of civilian and day-to-day services such as issuing permission to travel, build, export or import, and host relatives from abroad. The CA reprinted Jordanian textbooks for distribution in schools but did not update them. The CA was in charge of tax collection and land expropriation, which sometimes included Israeli seizure of olive groves that Arab villagers had tended for generations.

According to the Israeli Human Rights activists, the development of Jewish settlements in the Ramallah area, such as Beit El and Psagot, prevented the expansion of the city and cut it off from the surrounding Arab villages. As resistance increased, Ramallah residents who were members of the Palestine Liberation Organization were jailed or deported to neighboring countries. In December 1987, the popular uprising known as the Intifada erupted, protesting against the continued Israeli occupation.

First Intifada
Ramallah residents were among the early joiners of the First Intifada. The Intifada Unified Leadership, an umbrella organization of various Palestinian factions, distributed weekly bulletins on the streets of Ramallah with a schedule of the daily protests, strikes and action against Israeli patrols in the city. At the demonstrations, tires were burned in the street, and the crowds threw stones and Molotov cocktails. The IDF responded with tear gas and rubber bullets. Schools in Ramallah were forcibly shut down, and opened gradually for a few hours a day. The Israelis conducted house arrests, imposing curfews that restricted travel and exports in what Palestinians regarded as collective punishment. In response to the closure of schools, residents organized home schooling sessions to help students make up missed material; this became one of the few symbols of civil disobedience. The Intifada leadership organized "tree plantings" and resorted to the tactics used in pre-1948 Palestine, such as ordering general strikes in which no commercial businesses were allowed to open and no cars were allowed on the streets.

In 1991, the Palestinian delegation to the Madrid International Peace Conference included many notables from Ramallah. As the Intifada wound down and the peace process moved forward, normal life in Ramallah resumed. On September 13, 1993 Israeli Prime Minister Yitzhak Rabin and Palestinian Leader Yasser Arafat shook hands at a meeting at the White House. Schoolchildren in Ramallah handed out olive branches to Israeli soldiers patrolling the streets. In December 1995, in keeping with the Oslo Accords, the Israeli army abandoned the Mukataa and withdrew to the city outskirts. The newly established Palestinian Authority assumed civilian and security responsibility for the city, which was designated "Area A" under the accords.

Palestinian Authority rule

1990s
The years between 1993 and 2000 (known locally as the "Oslo Years") brought relative prosperity to Ramallah. Ramallah and its immediate environs were classified as Area A in the Oslo Accords, under full civil and security control of the Palestinian Authority (PA) administration in September 1995. Many expatriates returned to establish businesses there, and the atmosphere was one of optimism. In 2000, unemployment began to rise and the economy of Ramallah declined. The Israel Defense Forces remained in control of the territories and its government did not restore the freedom of movement enjoyed by Ramallah residents prior to the first Intifada. Travel to Jerusalem required special permits. The number and size of Israeli settlements around Ramallah increased dramatically. A network of bypass roads for use of Israeli citizens only was built around Ramallah, and Israel expropriated land for settlements.

Many official documents previously handled by the Israeli Civil Administration were now handled by the Palestinian Authority but still required Israeli approval. A Palestinian passport issued to Ramallah residents was not valid unless the serial number was registered with the Israeli authorities, who controlled border crossings. The failure of the Camp David summit in July 2000 led to the outbreak of the Second Intifada (al-Aqsa Intifada) in September 2000.

Second Intifada
Young Ramallah residents demonstrated daily against the Israeli army, with marches to the Israeli checkpoints at the outskirts of the city. Over time, the marches were replaced by sporadic use of live ammunition against Israeli soldiers; and various attacks targeting Jewish settlers, particularly on the Israeli-only bypass roads. Army checkpoints were established to restrict movement in and out of Ramallah.

On October 12, 2000, two Israeli army reservists, Vadim Norzhich and Yosef Avrahami were lynched in Ramallah. They had taken a wrong turn, and were set upon by a mob, enraged in particular by the Muhammad al-Durrah incident in Gaza. A frenzied crowd killed the two IDF reservists, mutilated their bodies, and dragged them through the streets. Later that afternoon, the Israeli army carried out an air strike on Ramallah, demolishing the police station. Israel later succeeded in capturing and prosecuting some of those involved in the deaths of the reservists.

The IDF has occasionally operated inside Ramallah, in breach of the 1995 Oslo Accords. The first and largest incursion was the 2002 Operation Defensive Shield, with a more recent intervention coming in March 2017 while attempting to arrest a suspected terrorist. In 2002, the army imposed curfews, electricity cuts, school closures and disruptions of commercial life. Many Ramallah institutions, including government ministries, were vandalized, and equipment was destroyed or stolen. The IDF took over local Ramallah television stations, and social and economic conditions deteriorated. Many expatriates left, as did many other Palestinians who complained that the living conditions had become intolerable. Construction of the Israeli West Bank barrier has added to Ramallah's isolation.

Yasser Arafat established his West Bank headquarters, the Mukataa, in Ramallah. Although considered an interim solution, Ramallah became the de facto capital of the Palestinian Authority, now officially known as the State of Palestine. It hosts almost all governmental headquarters. In December 2001, Arafat held meetings at the Mukataa, but lived with his wife and daughter in Gaza City. After suicide bombings in Haifa, Arafat was confined to the Ramallah compound. In 2002, the compound was partly demolished by the Israeli Defense Forces and Arafat's building was cut off from the rest of the compound.

On November 11, 2004 Arafat died at the Percy training hospital of the Armies near Paris. He was buried in the courtyard of the Mukataa on November 12, 2004. The site still serves as the Ramallah headquarters of the Palestinian Authority, as well the official West Bank office of Mahmoud Abbas. Throughout 2005, while the Disengagement Plan was underway, some US government officials suggested to the Palestinian leadership to move the provisional capital back to Gaza, where it had been when the Palestinian Authority was first established in 1994. President Abbas, however, refrained from doing so, arguing that at this point, it was important to keep the administrative center in the West Bank in order to remind the international community that the West Bank was still awaiting a territorial solution.

Economic rehabilitation
In December 2005, local elections were held in Ramallah in which candidates from three different factions competed for the 15-seat municipal council for a four-year term. The council elected Janet Mikhail as mayor, the first woman to hold the post.

Munir Hamdan, a member of Fatah and a Ramallah businessman, discussed the concentration of government offices with a journalist. He said, "The president and prime minister have their offices here. So do the parliament and all the government ministries", representing a "collusion" between the Palestinian Authority and Israel to turn Ramallah into the political as well as the financial capital of the Palestinians. He is particularly worried by the construction of a large new governmental complex by the PA. Hatem Abdel Kader, a Jerusalem resident, Fatah legislator and former Minister for Jerusalem Affairs, complained that "If they are building a new government compound here, that means they have no plans to be based in Jerusalem... Unfortunately, the Palestinian government of Salam Fayyad has abandoned Jerusalem in favor of Ramallah."

Many foreign nations have located their diplomatic missions to the Palestinian Authority in Ramallah, including, Argentina, Australia, Austria, Korea, South Africa, Norway, Sri Lanka, Switzerland, China, Poland, Portugal, The Netherlands, Russia, Jordan, Brazil, Finland, Denmark, Ireland, Germany, India, Japan, the Czech Republic, Canada and Mexico.

In November 2011, king Abdullah II of Jordan visited Ramallah for the first time since 2000.

Geography and climate
This area enjoys a Mediterranean climate of a dry summer and mild, rainy winter with occasional snowfall.

The Köppen climate classification places Ramallah in the Csa category. Climates of this class generally occur on the western sides of continents between the latitudes of 30° and 45°. These climates are in the polar front region in winter, and thus have moderate temperatures and changeable, rainy weather. Summers are hot and dry, due to the domination of the subtropical high pressure systems, except in the immediate coastal areas, where summers are milder due to the nearby presence of cold ocean currents that may bring fog but prevent rain.

Economy
Ramallah has been described as the seat of power of the Palestinian Authority and serves as the headquarters for most international NGOs and embassies. Hundreds of millions of dollars in aid flowing into the city have boosted Ramallah's economy greatly since the end of the Second Intifada.

The Ramallah construction boom is one of the most obvious signs of West Bank economic growth, estimated at an annual rate of 8 percent. This has been attributed to relative stability and Western donor support to the Palestinian Authority. Ramallah's buoyant economy continues to draw Palestinians from other West Bank towns where jobs are fewer. The built-up area has grown fivefold since 2002.

By 2010, Ramallah had become the leading center of economic and political activity in the territories under the control of the Palestinian Authority. During a building boom in the early years of the 21st century, apartment buildings and "five-star" hotels were erected, particularly in the Al-Masyoun neighborhood. In 2010, "more than one hundred" Palestinian businesses were reported to have moved to Ramallah from East Jerusalem, because "Here they pay less taxes and have more customers." One local boasted to a journalist that "Ramallah is becoming the de facto capital of Palestine." This boast was seconded by The New York Times which, in 2010, called Ramallah the "de facto capital of the West Bank. According to Sani Meo, the publisher of This Week in Palestine, "Capital or no capital, Ramallah has done well and Palestine is proud of its achievements." Some Palestinians allege that Ramallah's prosperity is part of an Israeli "conspiracy" to make Ramallah the capital of a Palestinian state, instead of Jerusalem.

ASAL technologies, an information technology company in Ramallah, has 120 employees and is looking forward to "exponential growth".

Demographics

An Ottoman village list of about 1870 showed that Ramallah had 249 houses and a population of 635, though the population count included men only. The village was described as being in the Bire area,"north of Mikhmas, on a rocky hill."

In 1896, the population of Ramallah was estimated to be about 2,061 persons.

In the 1922 census of Palestine conducted by the British Mandate authorities, Ramallah had a population of 3,104;  2,972 Christians, 125 Muslims, and 10 Jews, where the Christians were 2,162 Orthodox, 1 Syriac Orthodox (Jacobite), 332 Roman Catholics, 144 Greek Catholic (Melkite Catholic), 211 Church of England, and 122 "other". The population increased at the time of the 1931 census to 4,286, with 3,766 Christians, 519 Muslims and 1 Jew, in a total of 1014 houses.

In the 1945 statistics, the population stood at 5,080, with Christians forming the majority of the population. However, the demographic makeup of the town changed drastically between 1948 and 1967, when considerable emigration of Christians took place. Slightly more than half of the city's 12,134 inhabitants were Christian by 1967, the other half Muslim.

Ramallah's population drastically decreased in the late 20th century from 24,722 inhabitants in 1987 to 17,851 in 1997. In the Palestinian Central Bureau of Statistics (PCBS) census in 1997, Palestinian refugees accounted for 60.3% of the population, which was 17,851. There were 8,622 males and 9,229 females. People younger than 20 years of age made up 45.9% of the population, while those aged between 20 and 64 were 45.4%, and residents aged over 64 constituted 4.7%.

Only in 2005 did the population reach more than 24,000. In a PCBS projection in 2006, Ramallah had a population of 25,467 inhabitants. In the 2007 PCBS census, there were 27,460 people living in the city. Sources vary about the current Christian population in the city, ranging around 25%.

Health
In the aftermath of the 1936–39 Arab revolt, the Ramallah Hospital Foundation was established and registered as a tax exempt organization in New York in 1944. It bought large pieces of land in the south-eastern fringes of the city dedicated for the future hospital. In 1963 a hospital was opened. The present Ramallah Government Hospital and the Palestine Medical Centered are located on the land purchased by the Foundation. In January 1987 the first open-heart surgery was performed at the Hospital under the direction of Dr. Shehadeh (Shawki) Harb, a Palestinian surgeon trained in the United States.

Religious institutions
The Jamal Abdel Nasser Mosque is one of the city's largest. The Orthodox Church of Ramallah, an Orthodox Christian convent, Melkite Catholic Church, Evangelical Lutheran Church, Arab Episcopal (Anglican) Church, Ramallah Local Church (Evangelical\Born Again) and Ramallah Baptist Church all operate schools in the city. A large new church has been built on top of one of the highest hills of Ramallah, belonging to the Coptic Orthodox Church. A small group of Jehovah Witnesses are present in the area as well and others.

During the annual "Saturday of Light" religious festival (which occurs on the Saturday between Good Friday and Easter Sunday to commemorate the light that tradition holds shone from the tomb of Jesus), the scouts hold a parade through the city streets to receive the flame from Jerusalem. (The flame is ignited in Jerusalem's Church of the Holy Sepulchre and is passed on through candles and lanterns to regional churches.) A variety of mosques and churches of different denominations dot the landscape.

Culture

Ramallah is generally considered the most affluent and cultural, as well as the most liberal, of all Palestinian cities, and is home to a number of popular Palestinian activists, poets, artists, and musicians. It boasts a lively nightlife, with many restaurants including the Stars and Bucks Cafe, a branch of the Tche Tche Cafe and the Orjuwan Lounge, described in 2010 as two among the "dozens of fancy restaurants, bars and discotheques that have cropped up in Ramallah in the last three years".

One hallmark of Ramallah is Rukab's Ice Cream, which is based on the resin of chewing gum and thus has a distinctive taste. Another is the First Ramallah Group, a boy- and girl-scout club that also holds a number of traditional dance (Dabka) performances and is also home to men's and women's basketball teams that compete regionally. International music and dance troupes occasionally make a stop in Ramallah, and the renowned Argentinian-Israeli pianist Daniel Barenboim performs there often. The Khalil Sakakini Cultural Center, founded in 1996, is a popular venue for such events. The Al-Kasaba Theatre is a venue for plays and movies. In 2004, the state-of-the art Ramallah Cultural Palace opened in the city. The only cultural center of its kind in the Palestinian-governed areas, it houses a 736-seat auditorium, as well as conference rooms, exhibit halls, and movie-screening rooms. It was a joint venture of the Palestinian Authority, the United Nations Development Programme (UNDP), and the Japanese government. Ramallah hosted its first annual international film festival in 2004.

Ramallah folklore
Ramallah, like most Palestinian areas, has a rich folklore of song and dance. Songs accompanied people in every occasion whether it was the harvest season, roofing a house, traveling, coming back from travel, engagement, wedding, or even death. Most of the songs were sung by the women with the exception of Zaffeh and Mal'ab which are sung by the men at wedding celebrations. Palestinian educator Bahia Khalil's book "Ramallah Folklore Songs and Traditions" documents to a great extent this oral tradition inherited from one generation to another. The second edition of the book was published in 2002 by the American Federation of Ramallah, Palestine, an organization for Palestinian-Americans from the Ramallah region living in the United States.

Foreign travelers to Palestine in late 19th and early 20th centuries often commented on the rich variety of costumes among the Palestinian people, and particularly among the fellaheen or village women. Until the 1940s, a woman's economic status, whether married or single, and the town or area they were from could be deciphered by most Palestinian women by the type of cloth, colors, cut, and embroidery motifs, or lack thereof, used for the robe-like dress or "thoub" in Arabic.

Palestinian costume

Though experts in the field trace the origins of Palestinian costumes to ancient times, there are no surviving clothing artifacts from this early period against which the modern items might be definitively compared. Influences from the various empires to have ruled Palestine, such as Ancient Egypt, Ancient Rome, Byzantine empire, and Ayyubids, among others, have been documented by scholars largely based on the depictions in art and descriptions in literature of costumes produced during these times.

Hanan Munayyer, collector and researcher of Palestinian clothing, sees examples of proto-Palestinian attire in artifacts from the Canaanite period (1500 BCE) such as Egyptian paintings depicting Canaanites in A-shaped garments. Munayyer says that from 1200 BC to 1940 AD, all Palestinian dresses were cut from natural fabrics in a similar A-line shape with triangular sleeves. This shape is known to archaeologists as the "Syrian tunic" and appears in artifacts such as an ivory engraving from Megiddo dating to 1200 BC.

Until the 1940s, traditional Palestinian costumes reflected a woman's economic and marital status and her town or district of origin, with knowledgeable observers discerning this information from the fabric, colours, cut, and embroidery motifs (or lack thereof) used in the apparel.

Due to the difficulty of travel in the 19th century, villages in Palestine remained isolated. As a result, clothing and accessories became a statement of region. In Ramallah, the back panels of dresses often incorporated a palm tree motif embroidered in cross-stitch. Ramallah women were famous for their distinctive dress of white linen fabric embroidered with red silk thread. The headdress or smadeh worn in Ramallah was common throughout northern Palestine: a small roundish cap, padded and stiffened, with gold and silver coins set in a fringe with a long veil pinned to the back, sometimes of silk and sometimes embroidered.

Twin towns – sister cities
Ramallah is twinned with:

 Bordeaux, France
 Hounslow, England, United Kingdom
 Johannesburg, South Africa
 Liège, Belgium
 Muscatine, United States
 Oxford, England, United Kingdom
 Sur, Turkey
 Trondheim, Norway

Notable people
 Paul Ajlouny
 Mahmoud Eid
 Amber Fares
 Jibril Rajoub
 Mosab Hassan Yousef, former resident

See also
 Palestinian Christians
 Economy of the State of Palestine

References

Bibliography

 
 
  
 

 
  
  (pp. 40- 41) 
 

 
  
  
  
  
  
 Shaheen, Azeez (1982): Ramallah: Its history and genealogies. Birzeit University Press

External links

 Ramallah City 
 Welcome To The City of Ramallah
 Survey of Western Palestine, Map 17:  IAA, Wikimedia commons
 Ramallah History
 Music and Art from Ramallah 
 Quaker Meeting in Ramallah
 West Bank/Palestine
 Ramallah
 Al Kasaba Theatre
 Khalil Sakakini Cultural Centre
 First Ramallah Group
 Ramallah International Film Festival 
 RamallahOnline.com
 Ramallah Club of Metro Detroit
 Jnewswire.com, Ramallah ancient synagogue
 Anne Brunswic's book Welcome to Palestine, English translation

 
Capitals in the State of Palestine
Cities in the West Bank
Palestinian Christian communities
Populated places established in the 16th century
Municipalities of the State of Palestine